Raven's Flock was a professional wrestling stable led by Raven that was present in Extreme Championship Wrestling (ECW) between 1995 and 1997.

Later, Raven created other incarnations of the group in World Championship Wrestling (WCW) such as The Flock and The Dead Pool, and in Total Nonstop Action Wrestling (TNA) such as The Gathering and Serotonin.

Extreme Championship Wrestling

Raven's Nest 
Raven's Nest was a large stable with a frequently fluctuating membership in Extreme Championship Wrestling (ECW), consisting of Raven's followers, henchmen, paramours and several hired guns. The Nest chiefly assisted Raven throughout his feuds with Tommy Dreamer and The Sandman. Over the years, Raven's Nest members and allies included:

Stevie Richards, Tony Stetson, Johnny Hotbody, The Pitbulls, The Blue Meanie, The Dudley Brothers, Cactus Jack, Beulah McGillicutty, Francine, Kimona Wanalaya, Lupus, Lori and Tyler Fullington (as part of his feud with The Sandman), and Chastity.

World Championship Wrestling

The Flock 
The Flock was Raven's faction founded in August 1997 soon after his debut in World Championship Wrestling (WCW). All wrestlers in the faction adopted Raven's grunge gimmick, complete with similar ring attire.

Unlike other factions in WCW at the time, the group (though popular) met with limited success and lost most of their matches. The group disbanded after former member Saturn won the rest of the members' freedom from Raven on September 13, 1998, at Fall Brawl. The Flock is best remembered for hanging around in the crowd (usually at ringside) and then pouncing on any given wrestler, usually without provocation. Each member of the Flock was a social outcast for one reason or another and sought acceptance within the Flock:
 Stevie Richards – Raven's lackey from his ECW days, Richards appeared a few times with Raven in WCW before he failed a physical examination, which led to Richards returning to ECW.
 Hammer – A heavy metal star turned wrestler who was released from WCW and (kayfabe) had nowhere to go. He joined the Flock as an outcast, looking for work. He defeated Saturn in a "Loser leaves The Flock" match, but was thrown out of the group by Raven, who preferred Saturn on the May 11, 1998 edition of Nitro.
 Horace – Horace was recruited into the group solely because he was the nephew of then WCW World Heavyweight Champion Hollywood Hogan. Raven attempted to use him to get close to Hogan.
 Kanyon – Like many Flock members, Kanyon feuded with Raven before eventually joining him. Kanyon was the last person to join The Flock before it was disbanded. In spite of this, he remained loyal to Raven, and would stay by his side several months afterwards.
 Kidman – Kidman was said to be homeless before meeting Raven. He had something of a heroin addict gimmick, though this was never explicitly said on WCW television; he constantly scratched his body (a sign of heroin use) and exhibited other behavior linked with the drug. Kidman turned on Raven during his match at Fall Brawl, allowing Saturn to win and free The Flock. After his leaving The Flock, he exhibited a more hygienic presence and was no longer seen scratching himself.
 Lodi – Lodi had a psychological need for approval and acceptance, and so became Raven's most loyal lackey. He carried signs to ringside with slogans written on them which promoted the Flock and mocked their opponents, the fans, and sometimes rival promotions.
 Reese – Reese was an outsider in society for his massive size. Feeling that the outside world was only interested in his physical appearance rather than his true personality he sought solace with The Flock, becoming their most intimidating back up weapon.
 Riggs – In a match with Raven, former American Male Scotty Riggs fell victim to a kayfabe eye injury after Raven executed a drop toe-hold that drove Riggs face first into the seat of a steel chair. Forced to wear an eyepatch, Riggs began seeking revenge while Raven tried to recruit Riggs to join him. Raven further injured Riggs by hitting three DDTs while he was unconscious, then instructed The Flock to take possession of Riggs. He emerged from the injury just as despondent as the rest of the members.
 Saturn – Raven's enforcer, he eventually grew tired of Raven and left The Flock, causing the feud between the two which led to the disbanding of the group.
 Sick Boy – A Power Plant hopeful who wrestled as Lance Ringo against Diamond Dallas Page in his first televised match.  Despondent after being defeated in his first match, he would disappear for months until he was recruited by Raven to join the Flock in its crusade against Diamond Dallas Page.

Necro Ward / Dead Pool / Dark Carnival 
The Dead Pool (originally called the Necro Ward) was another stable centered on Raven. It was first put together in August 1999 while Raven was in WCW and saw him teaming up with Vampiro and the Insane Clown Posse (ICP) (Violent J and Shaggy 2 Dope). When Raven quit WCW and went back to ECW a month after the group's inception, Vampiro and ICP stayed together under the moniker the Dark Carnival and continued without him.

The group has since resurfaced numerous times, including in ICP's Juggalo Championship Wrestling (JCW) where ICP formed another version of the group, the Dead Pool 2000, with the addition of Balls Mahoney as well as various independent promotions where Raven and ICP team together. Members included:
 Vampiro
 Insane Clown Posse (Violent J and Shaggy 2 Dope)
 The Great Muta (joined after Raven left)
 The Demon (joined after Raven left)

Total Nonstop Action Wrestling

The Gathering 
When Raven joined Total Nonstop Action Wrestling (TNA), he formed a new version of the Flock, this time calling them The Gathering. The original Gathering members were Julio Dinero and Alexis Laree, with CM Punk joining the group soon after its inception. Punk and Dinero played 'adoring Raven fanboy' gimmicks, making Raven the main focus of the group. Alexis left both the group and TNA after being signed to a contract by World Wrestling Entertainment (WWE). On December 17, 2003, Punk and Dinero turned on Raven during a six-man steel cage match. Raven disappeared from TNA, while Punk and Dinero joined up with longtime Raven-enemy James Mitchell and continued to wrestle under the Gathering tag team name.

The team came to an abrupt end when Punk left TNA to remain in Ring of Honor (ROH). Dinero was eventually released. Mitchell disappeared for over a year before returning in July 2005 as the manager of Abyss.

Members included:
 Julio Dinero
 Alexis Laree
 CM Punk
 Cassidy Riley

Serotonin 
On the November 16, 2006 episode of Impact!, Kazarian, Maverick Matt, and Johnny Devine appeared with drastically changed appearances, calling themselves The New Movement. Later, through a series of vignettes, they revealed their name to be Serotonin, referencing the brain chemical of the same name that regulates, among other things, aggression, moodiness, and depression – things the Raven character has been linked to since its inception.

Raven's involvement with Serotonin began differently than with other incarnations of The Flock. Instead of speaking for the group during promos and being around at ringside during matches, Raven was only seen after matches, when he would come to the ring to hit the members with a kendo stick, regardless of the result of the match, as part of a program referred to as "torture builds success". The members would drop to their knees and took their licks without complaint, for the most part. The only dissension of being hit was that of Kazarian on occasion, but this was defused by the other members instead of Raven. Serotonin wrestled mostly on dark matches before pay-per-views and lost the majority of them. When wrestling in singles competition, members often took the role of jobbers to more established stars such as Kurt Angle, Sting or Jerry Lynn. Serotonin picked up their first official win at Against All Odds, defeating the team of Sonjay Dutt and Jay Lethal following interference from Maverick Matt. On the March 8, 2007 episode of Impact!, it was announced that Raven had changed their names: renaming Kazarian to Kaz, Maverick Matt to Martyr, and Johnny Devine to Havok. Dissension on the part of Kaz became more apparent during the Lockdown pre-show, in which Kaz refused to allow Christy Hemme to be attacked by Raven after Serotonin's loss to Voodoo Kin Mafia. Serotonin retaliated to this, distracting and therefore costing Kaz in a match against Chris Sabin on the March 31, 2007 episode of Impact!. On the June 21, 2007 episode of Impact!, Kaz turned on Serotonin by costing Raven a match against Chris Harris. On the July 12, 2007 episode of Impact!, Kaz defeated Martyr and Havok in a three-way match to earn a spot in the Ultimate X match at Victory Road. Kaz was subsequently attacked by Raven and the remaining members of Serotonin. Kaz defeated Raven in a match at Hard Justice. Bentley was later released by TNA, leaving only Havok and Raven as Serotonin members. Raven made few appearances in the succeeding months, some of which involved Raven and Havok aligning with Black Reign and James Mitchell, who were attempting to destroy Mitchell's longtime enemy and kayfabe son Abyss. On the November 15 episode of Impact!, Havok was revealed to be Team 3D's X Division traitor and reverting to his Johnny Devine ring name, effectively ending Serotonin. Members included:
 Havok
 Kaz
 Martyr

Members

ECW 
 Raven
 Stevie Richards
 The Broad Street Bullies (Tony Stetson and Johnny Hotbody) – fired on April 8, 1995, after losing to the Pitbulls
 The Pitbulls (Pitbull #1 and Pitbull #2)
 Beulah McGillicutty
 The Vampire Warrior
 The Dudley Brothers (Big Dick Dudley, Dudley Dudley and Lil' Snot Dudley)
 Cactus Jack – Turned on Tommy Dreamer and joined Raven to help send a message about hardcore wrestling to Dreamer.
 The Heavenly Bodies (Tom Prichard and Jimmy Del Ray)
 The Blue Meanie
 Kimona Wanalaya - Kimona replaced Beulah after Beulah left the Nest in January 1996.
 The Bruise Brothers (Don and Ron Harris)
 Brian Lee
 Super Nova
 Miss Patricia
 Don E. Allen
 Lori Fullington – The Sandman's ex-wife.
 Tyler Fullington – The Sandman's seven-year-old son. Raven brainwashed Tyler into "worshiping" him, and had him turn on Sandman during a match, hitting him with a Singapore cane. While Tyler was physically incapable of helping Raven defeat The Sandman, he was a useful psychological distraction.
 Lupus
 Chastity
 Reggie Bennett

WCW 
The Flock
 Raven
 Stevie Richards
 Hammer
 Horace
 Kanyon
 Kidman
 Lodi
 Reese
 Riggs
 Saturn
 Sick Boy
Necro Ward/Dead Pool/Dark Carnival
 Raven
 Vampiro
 Insane Clown Posse (Violent J and Shaggy 2 Dope)
 The Great Muta (joined after Raven left)
 The Demon (joined after Raven left)

TNA 
The Gathering
 Raven
 CM Punk
 Alexis Laree
 Julio Dinero
 Cassidy Riley
Serotonin
 Raven
 Havok
 Kaz
 Martyr

Championships and accomplishments 
 Extreme Championship Wrestling
ECW World Heavyweight Championship (2 times) – Raven
 ECW World Tag Team Championship (3 times) – Raven and Richards (2) Raven and Tommy Dreamer (1)
 World Championship Wrestling
 WCW United States Heavyweight Championship (1 time) – Raven
 WCW World Tag Team Championship (2 times) – Raven and Saturn (1) and Vampiro and Muta (1)
 WCW World Television Championship (1 time) – Saturn
 WrestleForce
 WrestleForce Tag Team Championship (1 time) – Lodi and Sick Boy

References

External links 
 TheRavenEffect.com (Official Raven Website)

Extreme Championship Wrestling teams and stables
Impact Wrestling teams and stables
World Championship Wrestling teams and stables
Fictional cults